The jet stream is a fast-moving high-altitude wind phenomenon.

Jet stream or Jetstream may also refer to:

Aeronautics
 British Aerospace Jetstream, a commuter aircraft
 Handley Page Jetstream, a 1960s twin turboprop aircraft
 BAe Jetstream 41, a "stretched" version of the Handley Page Jetstream
 Jetstream International Airlines, now PSA Airlines, an American regional airline
 Lockheed L-1649 Starliner, called "Jetstream" in TWA service, a four-engine airliner

Computing
 JetStream, a New Zealand internet service brand
 JetStream (software), now Navisworks, a 3D design review package for Microsoft Windows
 JetStream (software test), a browser speed test developed by Apple
 HTC Jetstream, a tablet computer

Arts and entertainment
 Jetstream (comics), a Marvel Comics character
 Jetstream (roller coaster), at Riverview Park, Chicago, Illinois, US
 Jet Stream (Six Flags Magic Mountain), a log flume ride in Santa Clarita, California, US
 "Jetstream" (song), by New Order, 2005
 Jetstream (TV series), a 2008 Canadian documentary series
 Toonami Jetstream, a defunct online broadband streaming service
 Jet Stream, a 2013 film written and produced by Phillip J. Roth
 Jetstream, a superhero character in the 2005 film Sky High
 Jetstream Sam, a character from the video game Metal Gear Rising: Revengeance

Other uses
 Jetstream, a line of hybrid ink ballpoint pens made by Uni-ball

See also
 Contrail, a line-shaped condensation trail produced by aircraft exhaust